Flora Diana Darpino (born 1961) is a retired United States Army lieutenant general and military lawyer who was the 39th Judge Advocate General of the United States Army. She was the first woman to hold that position, which she held from September 4, 2013 to July 14, 2017.

Education
Darpino graduated with a Bachelor of Arts from Gettysburg College in Pennsylvania, and received her Juris Doctor from Rutgers Law School in Camden, New Jersey, in 1986. She later received a Master of Laws in military law from The Judge Advocate General's Legal Center and School. She is a member of the New Jersey and Pennsylvania Bars.

Career
Darpino received a direct commission into the United States Army Judge Advocate General's Corps in January 1987. Her first assignment was to VII Corps in Stuttgart, Germany, where she was a trial defense counsel and chief of the civil law division.

She was later the training officer and assistant operations officer for the United States Army Trial Defense Service; litigation attorney, litigation division, United States Army Legal Services Agency; chief, Administrative Law, 101st Airborne Division (Air Assault) at Fort Campbell, Kentucky; assistant executive officer, Office of The Judge Advocate General; chief, Judge Advocate Recruiting Office; staff judge advocate, 4th Infantry Division at Fort Hood, Texas and Tikrit, Iraq; deputy staff judge advocate, III Corps at Fort Hood; chief, Criminal Law Division, OTJAG; staff judge advocate, V Corps, in Heidelberg, Germany; and staff judge advocate, United States Forces – Iraq, in Baghdad, Iraq. She served as the commander of the United States Army Legal Services Agency, Fort Belvoir, Virginia, and as the commander of the Judge Advocate General's Legal Center and School.

Awards and decorations

Personal life
Darpino is married with two daughters.

References

Living people
American military lawyers
United States Army generals
Recipients of the Legion of Merit
United States Army Command and General Staff College alumni
United States Army War College alumni
Recipients of the Defense Superior Service Medal
United States Army Judge Advocate General's Corps
Judge Advocates General of the United States Army
Female generals of the United States Army
1961 births
The Judge Advocate General's Legal Center and School alumni
Recipients of the Distinguished Service Medal (US Army)
21st-century American women